
Laguna Carreras is a lake in the Beni Department, Bolivia. Its surface area is 13 km².

References 

Lakes of Beni Department